Mexico national cerebral palsy football team is the national cerebral football team for Mexico that represents the team in international competitions.  The country has never participated at the Paralympics.

Background 
Federacion Mexicana de Deportes para Personas con Paralisis Cerebral (FEMEDEPC) manages the national team. In 2016, the national team was inactive as the country.  The sport was being developed with the goal in mind of establishing a national team.  The sport was developed enough to host a national championships.

National team development is supported by an International Federation of Cerebral Palsy Football (IFCPF) recognized national championship.  Recognized years for the national IFCPF recognized competition include  2010, 2011, 2012, 2013, 2014, and 2015.  In 2015, the championsion was in its seventh year. That year, six teams participated including  Jalisco, Tamaulipas, Veracruz, Estado de México, Michoacán, and Distrito Federal.

Players 
There have been a number of players for the Mexican squad.

Ranking 

Mexico was ranked twenty-first in the world by the IFCPF in 2016. The team is also ranked sixth in the Americas that same year. In November 2014, the team was ranked twenty-second. In August 2013, Mexico was ranked twenty-first. In July 2011 and September 2012, Mexico was ranked nineteenth.

Results 
The country has never participated in a Paralympic Games since the sport made its debut at the 1984 Games. Mexico  has participated in a number of international tournaments. At the Football 7-a-side International Tournament in Portugal in 2011, Mexico lost to Canada 2 - 3. Six teams participated in the Toronto hosted American Cup in 2014. Group A included Venezuela, Argentina and Canada.  Group B included Mexico, Brazil and the United States.  The tournament was important for preparations for the 2015 Parapan American Games, and because it was the last major continental level competition of the year.

References 

National cerebral palsy football teams
Mexico at the Paralympics
Mexico national football team